Red Clay Creek is a  tributary of White Clay Creek, running through southeastern Pennsylvania and northern Delaware in the United States.  As of 2000, portions of the creek are under wildlife habitat protection.

Course
The East and West branches both rise in West Marlborough Township, Chester County, Pennsylvania, near the hamlet of Upland, and flow south through Kennett Square before uniting just north of the Delaware border. The stream enters Delaware near the town of Yorklyn and flows southward through New Castle County, passing through Marshallton. Ultimately, White Clay Creek enters the Christina River, also near Stanton.

Tributaries
 Calf Run, located in the southeast of Mill Creek Hundred
 Pyle's Run, located in Christiana Hundred

History
The creek serves as a boundary between the Hundreds of Mill Creek and Christiana.  The Wilmington and Western Railroad follows the creek south from Yorklyn as far as Greenbank.

In the late 19th Century, several factories were located along Red Clay Creek, including those for the manufacture of flour, wool and iron.

The creek suffered from severe flooding in 1999 due to Hurricane Floyd and in 2003 due to Tropical Storm Henri.

Since 2000, portions of the river, along with other tributaries of White Clay Creek, have been protected as part of the White Clay Creek Wild and Scenic River.

Bridges
 Ashland Covered Bridge, in New Castle County, Delaware
 Wooddale Bridge, in New Castle County, Delaware

See also
 List of Delaware rivers
 List of rivers of Pennsylvania

References

External links
 U.S. Geological Survey: PA stream gaging stations
 Red Clay Valley Association
 Christina River Basin

Rivers of New Castle County, Delaware
Rivers of Delaware
Rivers of Pennsylvania
Tributaries of the Christina River
Rivers of Chester County, Pennsylvania